Ayios Nikolaos Station (also spelled Agios Nikolaos; , lit. "Saint Nicholas") is a British military station and part of in the British Sovereign Base Area of Dhekelia in Cyprus.  It is a former village (Ayios Nikolaos, SBA) connected by a road to the main area of the Dhekelia Garrison. The Joint Service Signal Unit (Cyprus) (JSSU(Cyp)), formerly 9th Signal Regiment and the Royal Air Force's 33 Signals Unit, is based at Ayios Nikolaos. This unit is a British Armed Forces run electronic intelligence gathering station.

The current superior body to JSSU (Cyp) appears to be the Joint Service Signal Organisation. The JSSO, as of 2012, was located at RAF Digby in Lincolnshire, under the command of a Group Captain of the RAF Operations Support Branch and had 1,600 staff which are drawn from all three services.

History
The station was established at Ayios Nikolaos shortly after the Second World War. In 1946 2 Wireless Company and 2 Special Wireless Group merged to become 2 Wireless Regiment RSigs. In 1959 2 Wireless Regiment became 9 Signal Regiment.

In early 1956 No. 751 Signals Unit RAF, a mobile radar convoy, was located at RAF Ayios Nikolaos. The unit radars initially comprised one Type 15, two Type 14s, and two Type 13s, conducting air defence. It moved to Cape Greco after March 1956. It was located there until 1959.

There were a number of court cases involving servicemen from the regiment during the 1980s, including the Cyprus Seven Trial, an alleged spy-ring operating at Ayios Nikolaos Station in 1984.

The Joint Service Signal Unit (Cyprus) (or JSSU (Cyp)) was formed on 1 April 1999, as a result of the amalgamation of the Joint Service Signal Unit (Ayios Nikolaos) and elements of 33 Signals Unit RAF. It is a three-squadron organisation, commanded by a Royal Signals Lieutenant Colonel, with a number of Royal Air Force and civilian contractors attached. Ayios Nikolaos or Agios Nikolaos is a very common place name in Greece and Cyprus; it is Greek for "Saint Nicholas".

For satellite interception, the Ayios Nikolaos station has a number of dish antennas of various sizes. Somewhere between 2008 and 2011, also a torus antenna was installed, which is able to receive the signals of up to 35 satellites simultaneously.

Declassified documents show that the station was run for the Government Communications Headquarters (GCHQ), and documents released by Edward Snowden suggest that in recent years half the cost of running the station is funded by the U.S. National Security Agency. It became the largest GCHQ site outside the UK.

See also
RAF Troodos

References

External links 
  Joint Service Signal Unit (only page 1; other pages withheld)

British military in Cyprus
Earth stations in Cyprus
UKUSA listening stations
Military of Sovereign Base Areas of Akrotiri and Dhekelia
1940s establishments in Cyprus